III liiga is the fifth-highest football league arranged by the Estonian Football Association. It consists of 48 teams, divided geographically into four divisions with 12 teams in each group north, east, west and south. The season starts around April and lasts until October.

III liiga North

Current clubs
The following clubs were competing in III Liiga North during the 2018 season.

III liiga East

Current clubs

The following clubs were competing in III Liiga North during the 2016 season.

a – never been relegated from III Liiga 
b – never played in II Liiga

III liiga South

Current clubs

The following clubs were competing in III Liiga South during the 2016 season.

a – never been relegated from III Liiga 
b – never played in II Liiga

III liiga West

Current clubs

The following clubs were competing in III Liiga South during the 2016 season.

a – never been relegated from III Liiga 
b – never played in II Liiga

Champions and top goalscorers

North division

East division

West division

South division

III liiga finals

III liiga Finals 2012

III liiga Finals 2013

III liiga Finals 2014

III liiga Finals 2015

III liiga Finals 2016

III liiga Finals 2017

III liiga Finals 2018

External links
 III liiga finals Estonian Football Association

5
Est
Estonian Football Championship